Taylor Hayes may refer to:
Taylor Hayes, American male actor from Songcatcher 2000
Taylor Hayes (The Bold and the Beautiful), a fictional character on the CBS soap opera The Bold and the Beautiful